"You Don't Love Me (No, No, No)" is a song by Jamaican recording artist Dawn Penn, released in February 1994 as the first single from her first studio album, No, No, No (1994). The song's lyrics are credited to Penn, Bo Diddley and Willie Cobbs, and production was handled by Steely & Clevie.

Penn had originally recorded a version of Cobbs' 1960 song "You Don't Love Me" in 1967, incorporating elements of its music and lyrics. It is claimed that the Cobbs song was, in turn, based on Diddley's 1955 song "She's Fine, She's Mine". Thus, both are credited as songwriters on Penn's recording. In 1994, after a 17-year break from the music industry, she re-recorded a dancehall version of the song retitled "You Don't Love Me (No, No, No)".

Penn's 1994 version of the song became a commercial success worldwide. In the United Kingdom, it peaked at number three on the UK Singles Chart. The song also reached the top 20 in Austria and Switzerland, and the top 40 in the Netherlands and New Zealand. In the United States, the single also charted at number 58 on the Billboard Hot 100 chart and at number 42 on the Hot R&B Singles chart. Multiple recording artists have performed cover versions and sampled "You Don't Love Me (No, No, No)" in their own works. Barbadian singer Rihanna remade the song for her debut studio album, Music of the Sun (2005), and American entertainer Beyoncé performed the song on her I Am... World Tour concert tour (2009–10). NME magazine ranked it at number 24 in their list of the 50 best songs of 1994.

Background
In Jamaica in 1967, Penn recorded a version of American R&B singer Willie Cobbs's song "You Don't Love Me", which "she first sang for Studio One. At least one writer claims Cobb had based his song on R&B singer Bo Diddley's 1955 recording "She's Fine, She's Mine". Penn's cover of Cobb's song was recorded at Kingston's Studio One by influential producer Coxsone Dodd. Dodd, who had lived for a while in the United States, imported American rhythm and blues records to play for his sound system entertainment businesses. Penn's song used lyrical and melodic elements of Cobbs' song, but was performed in the emerging rocksteady style – a precursor to reggae. It starts out with a drum roll, "then a chugging bass line kicks in and Penn's dreamy voice wails":

Dawn Penn's "You Don't Love Me" was a major hit in Jamaica. Based on this success she recorded some other songs, such as "Blue Yes Blue" and a reggae cover version of Scottish singer Lulu's "To Sir with Love". Despite her initial success, Penn decided to take a break from singing, which lasted 17 years. In the late 1980s, after working for banks, accountant agencies, and airlines, she returned to Jamaica in the hopes of reviving her career. In the early 1990s, she re-recorded a version of "You Don't Love Me" with the new title "You Don't Love Me (No, No, No)". The noted Jamaican production team Steely & Clevie produced it and it featured an updated dancehall arrangement. Songwriting is credited to Penn, Cobbs, and Diddley.

Chart performance
In the United States, "You Don't Love Me (No, No, No)" peaked at number 58 on the Billboard Hot 100 chart; it remained on the chart for 12 weeks. It also peaked at number 42 on the Billboard Hot R&B Singles chart, number 41 on the Billboard Hot R&B Airplay chart, and number 45 on the Billboard Hot 100 Airplay chart. In the Flanders region of Belgium, "You Don't Love Me (No, No, No)" debuted at number 44 on the chart week of 23 July 1994, and peaked at number eight in its eighth week; it remained on the chart for a total of 13 weeks. The song placed within the top 20 in Austria and Switzerland, peaking at numbers 13 and 17, respectively. "You Don't Love Me (No, No, No)" also reached number 25 in New Zealand and number 38 in the Netherlands, and peaked at number 41 in both France and Germany. In the United Kingdom, the song debuted at number nine on the UK Singles Chart during the week of 11 June 1994, later peaking at number three and remaining in the position for two consecutive weeks.

Critical reception
AllMusic editor Alex Henderson remarked that Penn's voice "has held up well over the years, and she's in generally good form". J.D. Considine from The Baltimore Sun stated, "For all the roughneck aggression meted out by most dancehall stars, it's worth noting that Jamaican pop still has its sweet side, and few singers can put that point across as convincingly as Dawn Penn does on 'No, No, No'." He also noted the way her "languid, drawling delivery plays off the slow, hypnotic pulse" of the track. Larry Flick from Billboard felt that Penn's "sultry vocal presence on this sailing, instantly memorable dancehall jam belies the pensive nature of the song's story of lost love. An easy-paced groove chugs along with a hip-hop-ish vibe that could prove accessible to crossover and urban formats." Dave Sholin from the Gavin Report stated, "Sure, to catch listeners' attention is this unique production from this Jamaican singing sensation." In his weekly UK chart commentary, James Masterton described it as a "haunting reggae ballad". Pan-European magazine Music & Media commented, "Nutty dreadlocks where art thou? Is real reggae still being made, with all those pale-faced pretenders around? Yes here, with all the dub production gadgets and all." 

Andy Beevers from Music Week gave the song four out of five, declaring it as "a reggae masterpiece." Another editor, Alan Jones, said, "This simple lovers rock tune initially fails to make an impression, but is a real grower." John Kilgo from The Network Forty commented that "it's hard to believe that a woman in her early 50's can spark such a rasta-rhythm tune. Boasting unique vocals with a grooving beat, "You Don't Love Me (No, No, No)" is sexy and infectious." Paul Ablett from the RM Dance Update stated that "this Studio One classic from the golden age of reggae has been brilliantly re-recorded with the ragga production geniuses Steely & Clevie." He added, "Despite digital drum and bass, it recaptures the original magic and once that horn break kicks in, you'll play it forever – an essential buy if ever there was one." Another editor, James Hamilton, described it as a "gorgeous calmly moaned haunting simple old fashioned Studio One-style 81bm rock steady reggae swayer". Charles Aaron from Spin said that producers "quirked-up remake of the 1967 reggae classic made my speakers rumble and swoon when a radio DJ finally wised up. Penn's mesmerizing voice plea is so precise and self-possessed that you figure she'll be fine whether her baby asks her to get down on her knees and pray or not. Inspiration for Luscious Jackson's masterfully strokin' "Daughters of the Kaos."

Impact and legacy
Charles Aaron from Spin ranked "You Don't Love Me" number 11 in his list of the "Top 20 Singles of the Year" in December 1994. NME magazine ranked it at number 24 in their list of the "50 Best Songs of 1994". BBC Radio 1 disc jockey Chris Goldfinger named the song one of his favourites in 1996, adding, "This is the original version — she's been around a long time. I just love her vocals and the lyrics." Q Magazine ranked the song number 477 in their list of the "1001 Best Songs Ever" in 2003. Blender listed it at 186th place on their "500 Greatest Songs Since You Were Born" in 2005. They wrote: "...dancehall producers Steely & Clevie polished her signature tune into her global comeback hit, wrapping Penn's heartbroken desperation in the sound of a lazy summer's afternoon. Emotional masochism never sounded so sweet."

Charts and certifications

Weekly charts

Year-end charts

Certifications

Covers and other versions

In 1994, French rapper and singer Melaaz released a cover version titled "Non, Non, Non" with French lyrics.

Reggae group Aswad sampled "You Don't Love Me (No, No, No)" for their song "You're No Good", taken from their album Rise and Shine (1994). "You're No Good" peaked at number 35 on the UK Singles Chart on 2 February 1995.

Female rapper Eve released a cover version with brothers Damian Marley and Stephen Marley on her 2001 album Scorpion. Maurice Bottomley for PopMatters reviewed the song, writing "Stephen Marley leads Eve through a note-for-note re-creation of the Dawn Penn (‘90s version) rocksteady classic 'No, No, No'. She sings it well enough, but it adds nothing to the original (literally)."

British music DJ's Hexstatic included a mix of the song on "Mr. Scruff's Ninja Tune Megamix" (Hexstatic Edit) by DJ Food on their 2002 DJ mix album Listen & Learn.

Bajan recording artist Rihanna recorded a cover version of the song as a duet with dancehall recording artist Vybz Kartel, for her debut studio album Music of the Sun (2005). It was produced by Evan Rogers, Carl Sturken and D. "Supa Dups" Chin-quee. Jason Birchmeier, writing for AllMusic, described Rihanna's cover as "catchy", while Chantal Jenoure, writing for The Jamaica Observer, labelled it as "hilarious".

English recording artist Lily Allen sampled the song for her "Shame for You", included on her debut studio album, Alright, Still (2006). Lucy Davies for the BBC reviewed the song, writing "Many of her reggae-fused songs stick in your head whilst you desperately suss out why they're familiar, but she rips off her influences with a comic acknowledgement, like 'Shame for You', which blatantly lifts the chorus hook from 'You Don't Love Me (No No No)' by Dawn Penn".

In 2007, American rapper Ghostface Killah covered the song on his compilation album, Hidden Darts: Special Edition, which consists of his rare album B-sides, unreleased songs and mixtape tracks.

American recording artist Beyoncé performed the song as part of a medley with her own hit "Baby Boy" on her I Am... World Tour concert tour (2009–10). After being lifted out of a 20-foot train by a harness and over the audience, she was lowered to the B-stage, where she finished "Baby Boy" and continued with Penn's "You Don't Love Me (No, No, No)". It was later included on the CD/DVD release of the tour. She performed a similar medley when she headlined at the 2018 Coachella Valley Music and Arts Music Festival, and during the first few European shows of her and her husband Jay-Z’s, OTR II Tour (2018), their second co-headlining, all-stadium tour together.

References

External links

1994 singles
1994 songs
Big Beat Records (American record label) singles
Rihanna songs
Songs written by Bo Diddley
Dawn Penn songs
Songs about heartache
Torch songs
Music Week number-one dance singles